was the Tokugawa shogunate's officially sanctioned copper monopoly or copper guild (za) which was created in 1636 and (1701–1712, 1738–1746, 1766–1768).

Initially, the Tokugawa shogunate was interested in assuring a consistent value in minted copper coins; and this led to the perceived need for attending to the supply of copper.

This bakufu title identifies a regulatory agency with responsibility for supervising the minting of copper coins and for superintending all copper mines, copper mining and copper-extraction activities in Japan.

See also
 Bugyō
 Kinzan-bugyō
 Kinza – Gold za (monopoly office or guild).
 Ginza – Silver za (monopoly office or guild).
 Shuza – Cinnabar za (monopoly office or guild)

Notes

References
 Hall, John W. (1955). Tanuma Okitsugu, 1719–1788: Forerunner of Modern Japan.  Cambridge: Harvard University Press.  OCLC 445621
 Jansen, Marius B. (1995). Warrior Rule in Japan. Cambridge: Cambridge University Press. ;  OCLC 422791897
 Schaede, Ulrike. (2000). Cooperative Capitalism: Self-Regulation, Trade Associations, and the Antimonopoly Law in Japan.  Oxford: Oxford University Press. ;  OCLC 505758165
 Shimada, Ryuto. (2005).  The Intra-Asian Trade in Japanese Copper by the Dutch East India Company. Leiden: Brill Publishers. ;  OCLC 62755669

Government of feudal Japan
Officials of the Tokugawa shogunate
Copper
Economy of feudal Japan
Metals monopolies
1636 establishments in Japan
Guilds in Japan